Carl Silvestri was a player in the National Football League for the St. Louis Cardinals and Atlanta Falcons in 1965 and 1966 as a defensive back. He played at the collegiate level at the University of Wisconsin–Madison.

Biography
Silvestri was born on March 27, 1943 in Milwaukee, Wisconsin. He attended St. Robert's elementary school and Shorewood High School in Shorewood, Wisconsin. Silvestri died on November 25, 2004 in Mequon, Wisconsin.

References

St. Louis Cardinals (football) players
Atlanta Falcons players
Wisconsin Badgers football players
Players of American football from Milwaukee
People from Shorewood, Wisconsin
1943 births
2004 deaths
Shorewood High School (Wisconsin) alumni